Sanga Moyu (山河燃ゆ) is a Japanese television drama based on the 1983 novel Futatsu no Sokoku (二つの祖国) by Toyoko Yamazaki. It was NHK's taiga drama in 1984.

Synopsis 
The Amo family lives in Los Angeles, California. Two of the sons, Kenji and Tadashi, live in Japan. Kenji returns to the United States before war broke out in 1941, and is sent to Manzanar with his family as part of the World War II incarceration of Japanese Americans. Kenji joins the United States Army and is sent to fight in the Philippines, where he shoots Tadashi, who joined the Imperial Japanese Army. Isamu, the third son, joins the 442nd. After the war Kenji finds Nagiko, a childhood friend who had confessed her love for him just before he returned to the United States. She was a victim of the bombing of Hiroshima. Kenji then becomes an interpreter at the International Military Tribunal for the Far East, where he commits suicide in the courtroom because of the internal turmoil caused by his split loyalties.

Cast 

 Matsumoto Kōshirō IX as Kenji Amo
 Toshiyuki Nishida as Tadashi Amo
 Kenji Sawada as Charlie Tamiya
 Yoko Shimada as Nagiko (Imoto) Tamiya
 Yumi Takigawa as Emi (Hatanaka) Amo
 Minoru Ōki as Imoto
 Toshiro Mifune as Otoshichi Amo
 Keiko Tsushima as Teru Amo
  as Isamu Amo
 Yoshie Kashiwabara as Haruko Amo

Reception 
Several Japanese American organizations like the Japanese American Citizens League were concerned that the portrayal of split loyalties would affect the movement for redress. Some individual Japanese Americans, including Mike Masaoka, also wrote to the NHK to express their concerns about airing the show in the United States. It was not broadcast in the United States until 1989. The show's name was also changed from "Futatsu no Sokoku" (Two Homelands) to "Sanga Moyu" (The Mountains and Rivers are Burning) for this reason.

The series was considered unusual in Japan because NHK's Taiga dramas usually concern history before the Meiji era. Many Japanese films at the time showed Japan as being the victims of World War II, but the NHK chose to include Japanese atrocities.

According to the Japan Times, the original novel was based on the life of Akira Itami.

TV schedule

References 

Taiga drama
1984 Japanese television series debuts
1984 Japanese television series endings
1980s drama television series
Cultural depictions of Hideki Tojo
Cultural depictions of Hirohito